Martin Murray is the name of:

 Martin Murray (boxer) (born 1982), British professional boxer
 Martin Glyn Murray (born 1966), Welsh actor
 Martin L. Murray (1909–1990), Democratic member of the Pennsylvania State Senate
 Martin Murray (footballer) (born 1958), Irish footballer and manager